The 2009 E3 Prijs Vlaanderen was the 52nd edition of the E3 Harelbeke cycle race and was held on 28 March 2009. The race started and finished in Harelbeke.

General classification

References

2009 in Belgian sport
2009